Ángel Benjamín Robles Montoya (born 8 November 1959) is a Mexican politician affiliated with the PT. He served as Senator of the LXII Legislature of the Mexican Congress representing Oaxaca, and previously served in the LX Legislature of the Congress of Oaxaca.

References

1959 births
Living people
People from Oaxaca
Members of the Senate of the Republic (Mexico)
Party of the Democratic Revolution politicians
21st-century Mexican politicians
Politicians from Mexico City
Members of the Congress of Oaxaca
Universidad del Valle de México alumni